Alejandro Michelena (born 27 September 1963) is a Uruguayan modern pentathlete. He competed at the 1988 Summer Olympics.

References

External links
 

1963 births
Living people
Uruguayan male modern pentathletes
Olympic modern pentathletes of Uruguay
Modern pentathletes at the 1988 Summer Olympics